Matthew Etan Jago (born 12 January 1987 in Johannesburg) is a South African judoka, who played for the half-middleweight category. He won a bronze medal for his division at the 2007 All-Africa Games in Algiers, Algeria, and silver at the 2008 African Judo Championships in Agadir, Morocco, losing out to Morocco's Safouane Attaf. He won a total of judo Sa Championship 12 gold medals.

Jago represented South Africa at the 2008 Summer Olympics in Beijing, where he competed for the men's half-middleweight class (81 kg). He received a bye for the second preliminary round, before losing out by a waza-ari (half-point) and a seoi-nage (shoulder throw) to Poland's Robert Krawczyk.

References

External links

NBC Olympics Profile

South African male judoka
Living people
Olympic judoka of South Africa
Judoka at the 2008 Summer Olympics
Sportspeople from Johannesburg
1987 births
African Games bronze medalists for South Africa
African Games medalists in judo
Competitors at the 2007 All-Africa Games
21st-century South African people